Push-up is a calisthenics exercise performed by raising and lowering the body using the arms.

Push-up may also refer to:

Arts and entertainment

Music 

 "Push UP", a 2006 song by the German ensemble: the Warp Brothers
 "Push Up" (song), a 2004 song by the British ensemble: the Freestylers
 Push Up, an EP by the British ensemble: the Freestylers
 Push Up Records, a Germany-based record label and subsidiary of Tunnel Records

Other uses 
 Push-Up, an ice cream brand owned by Nestlé
 Push up bra, a style of brassiere that augments the aesthetic appeal of the wearer's breasts with form-fitted lift and support
 Handstand push-up, a type of push-up exercise where the body is positioned in a handstand